The Severity Order or Reichenau Order was the name given to an order promulgated within the German Sixth Army on the Eastern Front during World War II by Generalfeldmarschall Walter von Reichenau on 10 October 1941.

Text of the order 
The order said, in part:

Implications of the order 
The order paved the way for mass murder of Jews.

All Jews were henceforth to be treated as partisans, and commanders were directed that they be either summarily shot or handed over to the Einsatzgruppen execution squads of the SS-Totenkopfverbände as the situation dictated.

Other dispositions complain about feeding civilians and POWs, which is described as an "equally misunderstood humanitarian act"; indeed, the taking of partisans and women as POWs is criticised.

Finally, the civilian population is to be disarmed and buildings which have been set on fire by Destruction battalions are to be saved only when useful to the army.

History of the order

Upon enactment 
Upon hearing of the Severity Order, Reichenau's superior Field Marshal Gerd von Rundstedt expressed "complete agreement" with it, and sent out a circular to all of the Army generals under his command urging them to send out their own versions of the Severity Order, which would impress upon the troops the need to exterminate Jews. According to Wilhelm Adam, when Reichenau died and General Friedrich Paulus assumed command of the Sixth Army, both the Severity Order and Hitler's Commissar Order were rescinded in his command sector.

After the war 
During the Nuremberg trials, Rundstedt denied any knowledge of that order before his capture by the Allies, although he acknowledged that Reichenau's orders "may have reached my army group and probably got into the office".

See also

Internal links 
 Barbarossa decree
 Commissar Order
 Commando Order
 Adolf Hitler's directives
 German war crimes

External links 
 Texts of the order:
Original version
English version

References 

Eastern European theatre of World War II
Eastern Front (World War II)
The Holocaust in Russia
Nazi war crimes
The Holocaust in Belarus
The Holocaust in Ukraine
1941 documents
Nazi war crimes in Russia